

Belgium
 Belgian Congo
 Maurice Lippens, Governor-General of the Belgian Congo (1921–1923)
 Martin Rutten, Governor-General of the Belgian Congo (1923–1927)

France
 French Somaliland – Jules Gérard Auguste Lauret, Governor of French Somaliland (1918–1924)
 Guinea – Jean Louis Georges Poiret, Lieutenant-Governor of Guinea (1922–1925)

Japan
 Karafuto – Nagai Kinjirō, Governor-General of Karafuto(17 April 1919 – 11 June 1924)
 Korea – Saitō Makoto, Governor-General of Korea (1919–1927)
 Taiwan – 
Den Kenjirō, Governor-General of Taiwan (31 October 1919 – September 1923)
Uchida Kakichi, Governor-General of Taiwan (6 September 1923 – September 1924)

Portugal
 Angola – João Mendes Ribeiro Norton de Matos, High Commissioner of Angola (1921–1924)

United Kingdom
 Malta Colony – Herbert Plumer, Governor of Malta (1919–1924)
 Northern Rhodesia
 Sir Francis Chaplin, Administrator of Northern Rhodesia (1921–1923)
 Richard Goode, acting Administrator of Northern Rhodesia (1923–1924)

Colonial governors
Colonial governors
1923